The Lord of Miracles (in Spanish: Señor de los Milagros), also known as "Christ of Miracles", is an image painted of Jesus Christ that is venerated in Lima, Peru. The image was painted during the 17th century by Benito or Pedro Dalcon, an African taken from what is now Angola to Peru as a slave. An annual procession commemorating the image occurs every October. It is one of the oldest Catholic traditions in Peru. It is one of the largest religious processions in the world.

Description of the Image

Jesus Christ is depicted on the cross, with the Holy Spirit and God the Father above. On the left is the Virgin Mary, and on the right is Mary Magdalene.

Its name originated in the 17 and 18th centuries, after earthquakes in 1655, 1687, and 1746 destroyed most of the city, leaving only the mural standing. This is considered a miraculous occurrence by many living there. What began as an Afro-Peruvian tradition was increasingly adopted by the Creole middle class in the 18th century after the third earthquake, which destroyed the city of Lima and much of the coast what is now the department of Lima and its provinces from Chancay to Canete.

Veneration
Every year in October, hundreds of thousands of pilgrims from all walks of life participate in a religious procession honoring the image through the streets of downtown Lima. 
The predominant color for the procession and the habits are purple with white rope. The procession route circles downtown Lima and takes approximately 20 hours to complete.
In the main plaza of Lima, the image is honored in three different building sharing the same square, by The President of Peru, The mayor of Lima, and the Archbishop of Lima in their respective buildings. Prior to this, The National Congress and Federico Villarreal National University honor the procession. On its path, people release purple and white balloons and throw flowers.
In Peru, the month of October is known as the purple month due to the colors of the procession.  There are seasonal delicious sweets like mazamorra morada ("purple pudding") and "Turron de Dona Pepa" that are very traditional for October traditions related to the history of the procession.

"The Fair of The Lord of The Miracles" is a celebration of bullfights since 1946, gathering the best bullfighters of the world, the months of October, November, and the first days of December, competing for "The Golden and Silver Scapulars of The Lord of the Miracles," taking place in Acho bullring in Lima.

See also 
Lord of Miracles of Buga

External links
  https://www.youtube.com/watch?v=jS4QAYkqUy8
  http://limacitykings.com/senor-milagros/
  https://www.peruhop.com/senor-de-los-milagros/
  https://www.americatv.com.pe/noticias/actualidad/senor-milagros-conoce-desvios-18-y-19-octubre-recorrido-procesional-n392198?ref=irela
  Pachacamac y el Señor de los Milagros: una trayectoria milenaria by Maria Rostworowski

Catholic Church in Peru
Lima
Festivals in Peru